Moggridge is a surname. Notable people with the name include:

Bill Moggridge (1943–2012), British designer, author and educator
Hal Moggridge, British landscape architect
John Traherne Moggridge (1842–1874), British botanist, entomologist, and arachnologist

See also
Moggridgea, a genus of spiders
Mogridge (surname)